Among Friends is a 1978 jazz studio album by American saxophonist Art Pepper playing with Russ Freeman, Bob Magnusson, and Frank Butler.

Track listing
"Among Friends" (Art Pepper)
"'Round Midnight" (Thelonious Monk)
"I'm Getting Sentimental Over You"
"Blue Bossa"
"What Is This Thing Called Love?"
"What's New"
"Besame Mucho"
"I'll Remember April"
(Recorded on 2 September 1978.)

Personnel
Art Pepper — alto saxophone
Russ Freeman — piano
Bob Magnusson — bass
Frank Butler — drums

References

1978 albums
Art Pepper albums
Interplay Records albums